"Ooo La La La" is a single by American R&B singer Teena Marie, which was released in 1988 and is featured on her album Naked to the World, released during the same year. The single became Teena Marie's biggest hit on the R&B chart.  "Ooo La La La"  peaked at number one on the Billboard R&B chart, and Marie's only number-one single on that chart. It peaked at number 85 on the Billboard Hot 100.

The single had a resurgence in popularity when the song was interpolated by the Fugees on the group's 1996 hit single "Fu-Gee-La". That same year, this song was covered by Experience_Unlimited on their album Make_Money. Trey Songz also heavily sampled the chorus of the song in his 2014 hit "Na Na".

It was also covered by the trip hop group Attica Blues on a Japan-exclusive single release in 1998.

American singer Beyoncé sampled "Ooo La La La" for her single "Cuff It" for her seventh studio album Renaissance (2022), for which co-writer Allen McGrier and Marie (posthumously) received a grammy for Best R&B Song at the 65th Grammy Awards.

Charts

Chart positions

References

1988 singles
Teena Marie songs
1988 songs
Contemporary R&B ballads
Soul ballads
1980s ballads